Walther Creed is a 9mm semi-automatic handgun manufactured by Carl Walther GmbH Sportwaffen. The pistol was released in 2016 for the United States market.

History and Description
The Walther Creed was introduced in 2016, after the Walther PPX had been discontinued. The PPX was Walther's first budget self-defense pistol, but it failed to achieve the success Walther had hoped for. The PPX was selling modestly well, and Walther hoped that a PPX-type pistol that more closely resembled the more popular Walther PPQ would catch on more. Walther decided to redesign the PPX with a simpler and improved design. In a lot of ways, the Creed can be viewed as an improved PPX, with a better trigger and a less bulky slide and a few other minor changes.

In 2019, Walther announced that, like the PPX, the Creed was being discontinued, with Walther presumably attempting to focus more effort on the more successful PPQ line. The PPQ itself would ultimately be discontinued in 2021, in favor of the more advanced Walther PDP. After the failure of the Creed and the PPX, Walther quit focusing efforts on making a budget self-defense handgun, however their earlier designs, the CCP and the PK380 both are still being produced, with the CCP especially having gained some popularity. The Creed and PPX can be viewed as ahead of their time, since shortly after the Creed was discontinued, a number of budget friendly handguns flooded the market, made by various manufacturers.

In 2022, the hammer design of the PPX and the Creed was resurrected for Walther's new .22 WMR pistol the Walther WMP.

Design details
The Creed and PPX look visually similar, however there are a few differences. In addition to the slide and trigger mechanism being different, the takedown lever and magazine release have been slightly changed for the Creed. Both magazine releases are reversible and allow the magazines to drop free. The Creed also has a rounded trigger guard while the PPX has a squared trigger guard. The Creed has a Picatinny rail like the PPX, but it has fewer slots. The low-profile sights on both designs are slightly different, but both are made of steel.

There are numerous things in the designs that are either similar or the same. The trigger mechanism is more or less the same, only on the PPX the hammer is much taller and thicker. The PPX can be considered a true double-action only design, as the hammer returns with the slide. However, the hammer is partially cocked for a lighter trigger pull. The Creed has a similar design, but with a much smaller hammer that is largely concealed in the slide, similar to a Ruger Security-9. The Creed also has a slightly lighter trigger pull. Both pistols have the same non-ambidextrous slide release.

The grips, while different, are very similar. The Creed also has a wider grip that looks more like the PPQ's texture, but there are no interchangeable backstraps. Despite being wider, the Creed's grip is not as long as the PPX. The barrels used by both firearms are exactly the same, as the MIM sleeve on the barrel is part of how Walther was able to produce the firearm for an affordable price. Both the Creed and the PPX use the same magazines, which are made out of steel. Both pistols have a polymer frame, and a tenifer-coated alloy steel slide. Both designs have front cocking serrations.

The pistol has three safeties, including a 2 drop safeties. Like the PPX, the Creed does not have a magazine disconnect safety.

References

9mm Parabellum semi-automatic pistols
Walther semi-automatic pistols